The men's 800 metres at the 2015 World Championships in Athletics was held at the Beijing National Stadium on 22, 23 and 25 August.

Summary
There is a definite change in this event.  Returning silver medalist Nick Symmonds and returning bronze medalist Ayanleh Souleiman did not enter.  Returning champion Mohammed Aman was disqualified for interference in the semi-final round.  In fact, of the eight finalists in 2013, only Pierre-Ambroise Bosse returned to the final.  Olympic silver medalist, the promising young Nijel Amos got pipped at the line in his slowest heat of the semi-finals and had to watch the final. World record holder David Rudisha did make the final winning that semi, but has not been running the times he ran during his world record years.  The only other finalist with Olympic or World Championship 800 finals experience was 2011 sixth placer Adam Kszczot.

In the final, as world record holder, Rudisha commanded all eyeballs.  The field expected Rudisha to lead and lead he did, but not to a 50-second first lap, but a very slow 54.15.  For point of comparison, 54.15 was exactly the same time Mo Farah ran in the last lap of the 10,000 metres in these championships.  With his compatriot Ferguson Cheruiyot Rotich on his shoulder, the two acted as a wall at the front, but nobody else looked like they wanted to pass.  200 more metres went by at the slow pace, finally Kszczot tried to sneak by on the inside, but Rudisha wouldn't let him, accelerating to maintain the lead and continuing to speed up.  With world leader and notable kicker Amel Tuka perfectly aligned to pounce, Rudisha just continued to speed up.  Only Kszczot was able to follow but the entire field was losing ground.	
Tuka's speed was not in evidence to the same degree as his previous races this season, instead straining to go around Cheruiyot to get the bronze medal.  Tuka's medal was the first for Bosnia and Herzegovina.  But it was the old guard 1-2 vs the newcomers.	

How did Rudisha's strategy work against these elite athletes?  His last 200 metres was timed at 24.34, a speed most of these athletes are unfamiliar with at the end of a race.  Even when a kicker like Tuka, or others with a similar strategy; Symmonds. Borzakovskiy, Robinson or Wottle runs by, they are passing slowing, depleted athletes with a 26+ or high 25 final 200.  And most of these competitors are the ones slowing to make that final 200 from a kicker look so impressive.  Additionally, with the Kenyan's expert team tactics, Cherulyot's position caused everyone except Kszczot to have to run around Cherulyot at speeds they are not used to.  Save Tuka's exceptional finishing speed, the strategy would have gotten Cherulyot a bronze medal.

Records
Prior to the competition, the records were as follows:

Qualification standards

Schedule

Results

Heats
Qualification: Best 3 (Q) and next 6 fastest (q) qualify for the next round.

Semifinals
Qualification: First 2 in each heat (Q) and the next 2 fastest (q) advanced to the final.

Final
The final was started at 20:55.

References

800
800 metres at the World Athletics Championships